LayerOne, Inc. acquired by Switch & Data , in 2005, was a U.S. private corporation that provides carrier-neutral datacenters and interconnection.

Services
LayerOne was a provider of network-neutral data centers and interconnection services, offering colocation, traffic exchange and outsourced IT infrastructure solutions. The company pioneered the concept of 'buy-side' interconnection, whereby carriers were encouraged to participate in 'pooling points' in major cities without upfront costs. Carriers who sold connectivity were charged a monthly recurring fee based on the capacity of the connection. Within three years the company provided interconnection services to every major and most minor telecommunications companies in the United States with the notable exception of Sprint.

American datacentres
Dallas, Texas
Miami, Florida
Chicago, Illinois

Notable customers
More than 800 different carriers, ISPs and businesses participate in LayerOne centers, including the world's largest IP backbone networks.

AT&T
MCI
AOL
SBC
Comcast
Bell South
CenturyTel
CTS Telecom
Broadwing
UUNet
Verizon
Cogent
Level 3
Microsoft
MSN
NTT Communications
SAVVIS
McCleod
UUNET
Verizon
Yahoo!

Company history
LayerOne was founded in 1999 by Alexander Muse. By 2001 the company had raised more than $20,000,000 in venture capital and opened facilities in Dallas, Chicago and Miami. While each facility was cash flow positive, the company had executed leases throughout the United States in anticipation of additional funding. When that funding did not materialize Alexander Muse and his management team reorganized the company under the U.S. Bankruptcy code. Within three months the company was profitable and over the next three years the company grew by more than 1000%. In 2005 the company was sold to Switch & Data providing a 600% return for the company's investors.

Sources
LayerOne invention of virtual pooling points
CityNet enters LayerOne
Cable & Wireless enters LayerOne
LayerOne Best Corporate Turnaround 2005
Level 3 enters LayerOne
The LayerOne Story
Official Website

Telecommunications companies established in 1999
1999 establishments in Texas